Ádám Kósa (born 1 July 1975) is a Hungarian politician and Member of the European Parliament (MEP) from Hungary. He is a member of Fidesz.

He is the first deaf European politician user of Deaf Sign Language at the European Parliament.

Education

See also
2009 European Parliament election in Hungary

References

1975 births
Living people
Deaf politicians
Politicians from Budapest
Fidesz MEPs
MEPs for Hungary 2009–2014
MEPs for Hungary 2014–2019
MEPs for Hungary 2019–2024
Hungarian deaf people